Manduca lichenea is a moth of the family Sphingidae first described by Hermann Burmeister in 1855.

Distribution 
It is known from south-eastern Brazil.

Description 
The wingspan is about 94 mm.

References

Manduca
Moths described in 1855
Sphingidae of South America
Moths of South America